Politeia was a peer-reviewed academic journal covering political science and public administration, including municipal government and administration, international politics, and strategic studies.

External links 
 

Political science journals
Triannual journals
Publications established in 1982
Publications disestablished in 2002
English-language journals